CFLX-FM is a Canadian radio station, broadcasting at 95.5 FM in Sherbrooke, Quebec. The station airs a francophone community radio format for Sherbrooke and the Estrie region.  More than 50% of its weekly programming is produced live.

The callsign CFLX is made after the name of the very famous Quebec poet Félix Leclerc.

The station is a member of the Association des radiodiffuseurs communautaires du Québec.

External links
 CFLX-FM
 
 

Flx
Flx
Flx
Radio stations established in 1984
1984 establishments in Quebec